The Kleptones are a one-man English electronic music act fronted by music producer and DJ Eric Kleptone. They are best known for their Internet-exclusive mashup albums. Typically, Eric Kleptone mixes rock/R&B instrumentals with rap and hip-hop vocals in a style that is "fun... and often surprising". Both his name and the group's name are parodies of the famous guitarist Eric Clapton, and a play on the fact that he is a "klepto of tones" (that is, he "steals" others' music).

History
The group's first release was a mix of Yoshimi Battles the Pink Robots by The Flaming Lips with hip-hop/rap vocals and various soundbites from television programs and movies entitled Yoshimi Battles the Hip-Hop Robots.

A Night at the Hip-Hopera was the group's breakthrough and most highly acclaimed album, fusing Queen's rock music with rap vocals and many soundbites from movies and other sources. On 8 November 2004, Waxy, the main site that was mirroring A Night at the Hip-Hopera, received a cease and desist notice from the Walt Disney Company for illegal sampling of songs by Queen, similar to the banning of DJ Danger Mouse's The Grey Album.

From Detroit to J.A. was created originally for the radio program The Rinse on XFM, and was originally broadcast on 23 January 2005. Subsequently, it was released as an internet-only album, which fused R&B instrumentals with pop, rap, and R&B vocals.

In mid-2005, Eric Kleptone was awarded the Webby Award for Artist of the Year by the International Academy of Digital Arts and Sciences, who stated he had "taken the art of mash-up to a new level" and become "a global sensation".

In 2006, the group released 24 Hours, a double length album. The release of 24 Hours was preceded by three EP length releases, EP1, EP2 and EP3.  Each EP was available for download for a limited time—EP2 replaced EP1, and in turn was replaced by EP3. EP3 itself was removed when 24 Hours was released.

In May 2006, the Creative Commons-licensed film project A Swarm of Angels announced the Kleptones as soundtrack producers.

In late 2006, Eric Kleptone was invited to speak at the Web 2.0 Summit in San Francisco, as half of "The Pirate and the Suit", a head-to-head discussion with EMI Music vice-Chairman David Munns.

On 7 December 2006, Eric Kleptone posted a podcast, titled Hectic City on the Kleptones' blog, stating that the intention is to make it a weekly release. The podcast contains mash-ups by the Kleptones, and other artists.

In early 2008 the group released Live'r Than You'll Ever Be - Bestival 2007, a live album containing a recording of their show at Bestival, in the Isle of Wight, on Saturday 8 September 2007.

On 1 January 2010, Uptime / Downtime was released. One preview of the album, the track "Voodoo Sabotage" was released on the Kleptones blog a few weeks prior to release. Later that year, on 9 August 2010, a collection of B-sides and tracks that didn't make it onto an album, Shits & Giggles was released.

On 28 January 2018 a new EP, "COUNT-IN (1234)" was released. On 25 April 2018, The Kleptones announced via their mailing list that a new album would be released later in the year and preceded by four mixtapes. On 18 October 2018, the first of these albums, OV, was released through their mailing list after an experimental release, in which random subscribers received tracks from the album and were asked to compile the album together, was unsuccessful. The second part, LO, was released through the mailing list on 11 February 2019, after a similar experimental release. The third part, ER, was released 18 February 2020; the experimental release system was bypassed and the final album was sent directly to subscribers. The final part, AD, making the entire project come together as "OVERLOAD", was released 13 July 2021; the entire project adding up to over 8 hours.

Starting on 22 March 2020, The Kleptones started releasing a series of "Lockdown Radio" mixes.

Discography

Albums

Remix albums

Live albums

Extended plays

Singles

Mixtapes

References

External links
 Official website

British hip hop DJs
English DJs
English record producers
Remixers
British mashup artists
Living people
Year of birth missing (living people)
Musicians from Brighton and Hove
21st-century British musicians